Aurostibite is an isometric gold antimonide mineral which is a member of the pyrite group. Aurostibite was discovered in 1952 and can be found in hydrothermal gold-quartz veins, in sulfur-deficient environments that contain other antimony minerals. The mineral can be found in Yellowknife in the Northwest Territories of Canada, and the Timiskaming District in Ontario, Canada. Antimonides are rare and are normally placed in the sulfide class by mineralogists.

See also
 List of minerals

References

Gold minerals
Antimonide minerals
Pyrite group
Cubic minerals
Minerals in space group 205
Minerals described in 1952